Iron City is an album by American jazz guitarist Grant Green featuring performances said to be recorded in 1967 and first released on the Cobblestone label in 1972. While "Big" John Patton is credited on the sleeve, anecdotal evidence from drummer Ben Dixon and Patton himself has suggested it was Larry Young actually playing on the record.

Reception

The Allmusic review by Stephen Thomas Erlewine awarded the album 3 stars calling it "a fine, overlooked date that showcases some of Green's hottest, bluesiest playing".

Track listing
All compositions by Grant Green except as indicated
 "Iron City" - 5:04  
 "Samba de Orpheus" (Luiz Bonfá, Antônio Maria, André Michel Salvet) - 7:08  
 "Old Man Moses (Let My People Go)" (Traditional) - 6:59  
 "High Heeled Sneakers" (Robert Higginbotham) - 6:04  
 "Motherless Child" (Traditional) - 8:03  
 "Work Song" (Nat Adderley) - 6:11
Recorded in Pittsburgh, PA in 1967

Personnel
Grant Green - guitar
"Big" John Patton - Hammond B3 organ (under contention)
Ben Dixon - drums

References 

Cobblestone Records albums
Grant Green albums
1972 albums